The Goroka Lahanis are a semi professional Papua New Guinean rugby league team from Goroka in the Eastern Highlands Province. They currently compete in the Papua New Guinea National Rugby League Competition. Their home ground is located within the National Sports Institute.

2022 squad

Honours

League
PNGNRL Digicel Cup
Winners (5): 1993, 1999, 2010, 2011, 2018,
Runners up (4): 1994, 2001, 2006, 2013,

See also

References

External links
Goroka Lahanis website

Papua New Guinean rugby league teams